Caleigh Anne Forsyth-Peters is a studio executive and former singer-songwriter. Born in San Francisco, California, she was raised in Los Angeles and is the daughter of Jon Peters and producer Christine Forsyth. She is the goddaughter of Barbra Streisand.

Career 
She sang on numerous film soundtracks, including those for Ice Princess, Herbie: Fully Loaded, and Go Figure. In 2005, she won the "Ones to Watch" Award at the Young Hollywood Awards. 
She attended the Fashion Institute of Design and Merchandising in Los Angeles.

Discography

Compilation and soundtrack contributions 
 2005 - "Reach" — from Ice Princess (Original Soundtrack) and Disney Girlz Rock
 2005 - "I Can Do Anything" — from Go Figure (Original Soundtrack)
 2005 - "Fun, Fun, Fun" — from Herbie: Fully Loaded (Original Soundtrack)
 2005 - "Just What I Needed" — from Sky High (Original Soundtrack)
 2005 - "Feels Like Christmas" — from Radio Disney Jingle Jams 2
 2006 - "Feels Like Christmas" — from Totally Awesome Christmas, Volume One
 2007 - "I Can Do Anything" — from Music From and Inspired by W.I.T.C.H.

References

External links 
 Caleigh Peters on Facebook
 
 Hollywood Records - Caleigh Peters
 Video of receiving a Young Hollywood award
 New York Times Movies listing

1988 births
Living people
Hollywood Records artists
American people of Dutch descent
American people of Italian descent
Musicians from Los Angeles
American child singers
21st-century American singers
21st-century American women singers